"Lovin' You Is Fun" is a song written by Jim Beavers and Bob DiPiero and recorded by American country music artist Easton Corbin. It was released in February 2012 as the first single from Corbin's 2013 album All Over the Road.

Critical reception
Billy Dukes of Taste of Country gave the song four and a half stars out of five, writing that "there is a little lesson to be learned from Corbin’s message, but the easy rhythm makes this one that few will take issue with learning again and again." Matt Bjorke of Roughstock gave the song four stars out of five, calling it "a strong, melodic and memorable single."

Ben Foster of Country Universe gave the song a B+ grade, saying that the song "is a smooth, steel-heavy two-stepper, which Corbin effortlessly eases into with his signature laid-back vocal style that repeatedly draws comparisons to George Strait" and "the lyrics don’t warrant much explanation, but the sonic packaging almost makes them seem inconsequential."

Music video
The music video was directed by Shaun Silva and filmed in Austin, Texas. It premiered in April 2012 as part of CMT Big New Music Weekend.

Chart performance
"Lovin' You Is Fun" debuted at number 59 on the U.S. Billboard Hot Country Songs chart for the week of March 3, 2012. It also debuted at number 100 on the U.S. Billboard Hot 100 chart for the week of July 7, 2012. It also debuted at number 99 on the Canadian Hot 100 chart for the week of November 3, 2012.

Year-end charts

Certifications

References

2012 singles
2012 songs
Easton Corbin songs
Mercury Records singles
Songs written by Jim Beavers
Songs written by Bob DiPiero
Music videos directed by Shaun Silva
Song recordings produced by Carson Chamberlain